The U23 Women's scratch was one of the 8 women's under-23 events at the 2009 European Track Championships, held in Minsk, Belarus. It took place on 19 July 2009. 22 participated in the race.

Ellen van Dijk, who won the European title in 2008 and was still under-23, did not defend her title.

Competition format
A scratch race is a race in which all riders start together and the object is simply to be first over the finish line after a certain number of laps. There are no intermediate points or sprints.

Final results

DNS = did not startSources

See also

2009 European Track Championships – U23 Women's points race

References

European Track Championships – U23 Women's scratch
2009 European Track Championships